Breg pri Polzeli is a settlement in the Municipality of Polzela in Slovenia. It lies on the left bank of the Savinja River southeast of Polzela. The area is part of the traditional region of Styria. The municipality is now included in the Savinja Statistical Region.

Name
The name of the settlement was changed from Breg to Breg pri Polzeli in 1953.

Cultural heritage
A small roadside chapel in the settlement dates to 1925.

References

External links

Breg pri Polzeli on Geopedia

Populated places in the Municipality of Polzela